Hermann von Wissmann was a German steamer on Lake Nyasa named after the German explorer Hermann von Wissmann who had raised funds for the vessel to be built in 1890 as an anti-slavery gunboat.

The attack of the British lake-steamer  on Hermann von Wissmann while it was on a slipway at Liuli, was the first naval action of World War I. The British disabled the vessel briefly in 1914, then in 1915 completely put the vessel out of action.

Hermann von Wissmann had a smaller sister vessel, named after Wissmann's wife, on Lake Tanganyika. This smaller vessel was involved in the exploits of Geoffrey Spicer-Simson which were the basis of The African Queen, a 1935 novel by C. S. Forester and the 1951 film of the same name starring Humphrey Bogart and Katharine Hepburn.

References

External links
The History Guy explains the role of this ship in the battle for Lake Nyasa. The History Guy

Gunboats of the Imperial German Navy
Steamships of Germany
Lake Malawi
1890 ships
Ships of Tanzania
Lake Tanganyika